Hyperomyzus is a genus of aphids in the family Aphididae. There are more than 20 described species in Hyperomyzus.

Species
These 21 species belong to the genus Hyperomyzus:

 Hyperomyzus accidentalis (Knowlton, 1929)
 Hyperomyzus carduellinus (Theobald, 1915)
 Hyperomyzus gansuensis (Zhang, Chen, Zhong & Li, 1999)
 Hyperomyzus hieracii (Börner, 1939)
 Hyperomyzus inflatus (Richards, 1962)
 Hyperomyzus lactucae (Linnaeus, 1758) (blackcurrant—sowthistle aphid)
 Hyperomyzus lampsanae (Börner, 1932)
 Hyperomyzus nabali (Oestlund, 1886)
 Hyperomyzus niger (Baker, 1934)
 Hyperomyzus nigricornis (Knowlton, 1927)
 Hyperomyzus pallidus Hille Ris Lambers, 1935
 Hyperomyzus petiolaris (Knowlton & Allen, 1945)
 Hyperomyzus picridis (Börner, 1916)
 Hyperomyzus pullatus Hall & Garraway, 2009
 Hyperomyzus rhinanthi (Schouteden, 1903)
 Hyperomyzus ribiellus (Davis, 1919)
 Hyperomyzus sandilandicus (Robinson, 1974)
 Hyperomyzus sinilactucae Zhang, 1980
 Hyperomyzus thorsteinni Stroyan, 1960
 Hyperomyzus yulongshanensis Zhang, Zhong & Zhang, 1992
 Hyperomyzus zirnitsi Hille Ris Lambers, 1952

References

Further reading

External links

 

Articles created by Qbugbot
Sternorrhyncha genera
Macrosiphini